Tamil 99 is a keyboard layout approved by the Tamil Nadu Government. The layout, along with several monolingual and bilingual fonts for use with the Tamil language, was approved by government order on 13 June 1999. 
Designed for use with a normal QWERTY keyboard, typing follows a consonant-vowel pattern.  The arrangement of the characters allow for fast and simple typing for users familiar with the script.

See also 
 Tamil keyboard
 InScript keyboard

References

External links 
 Tamil99 Extended Keyboard Help
 Tamil99 Web Keyboard
 Web-based input with Tamil99

Tamil input methods
Keyboard layouts
Indic computing